Flabellidae is a family of marine corals. It consists of the following genera: 
 Blastotrochus Milne Edwards & Haime, 1848
 †Conosmilia Duncan 1865
 Falcatoflabellum Cairns, 1995
 Flabellum Lesson, 1831
 Javania Duncan, 1876
 Monomyces Ehrenberg, 1834
 Placotrochides Alcock, 1902
 Placotrochus Milne Edwards & Haime, 1848
 Polymyces Cairns, 1979
 Rhizotrochus Milne Edwards & Haime, 1848
 †Tortoflabellum Squires, 1958 
 Truncatoflabellum Cairns, 1989

References 

 
Scleractinia
Cnidarian families